(January 24, 1904 – August 10, 1969) was a Japanese politician who served as Director General of the Japan Defense Agency during the 1960s.

Life and career
Koizumi was born  in Higashi-Kaseda, Kagoshima Prefecture (now part of Minami-Satsuma); his family were fishermen. He attended high school at night while working in a department store, and then attended law classes at Nihon University while working as a secretary to a Diet member. He graduated in 1930 and joined the Rikken Minseitō political party. He was elected to the Diet in 1937.

He married Yoshie Koizumi, the daughter of Rikken Minseitō director and postal minister Matajirō Koizumi, taking her family name. Junya and Yoshie Koizumi had six children, including Jun'ichirō Koizumi, who later became the Prime Minister of Japan.

Koizumi was purged from politics by the Allied occupation government in the late 1940s, but returned to the Diet in 1952. He was a close ally of Nobusuke Kishi in the postwar years, served as Vice-Minister of Justice under Ichirō Hatoyama and became Director General of the Japan Defense Agency under Hayato Ikeda and Eisaku Satō.

See also 
 Koizumi family

1904 births
1969 deaths
Members of the House of Representatives (Japan)
Japanese defense ministers
Junya
Members of the House of Representatives (Empire of Japan)
Rikken Minseitō politicians
Nihon University alumni
Parents of prime ministers of Japan